Songs from the South, subtitled Paul Kelly's Greatest Hits, is a greatest hits album by Australian singer-songwriter Paul Kelly. It was released on 13 May 1997 by Mushroom Records. The album peaked at No. 2 on the Australian Recording Industry Association Albums Chart. It was certified 7× platinum by 2017.

The songs are drawn from Kelly's previously released albums issued between 1985 and 1996.  Two tracks on the album are exclusive to this release: a live recording of "Everything's Turning to White", and a newly-recorded acoustic version of "When I First Met Your Ma". Kelly later released similarly titled compilation albums, Songs from the South Volume 2 (Paul Kelly 98–08) (November 2008) and Songs from the South: 1985–2019 (November 2019).

Reception

Track listing

Charts

Weekly charts

Year-end charts

Certifications

References

Further reading
 Reviews Paul Kelly's Songs from the South and Songs from the South Volume 2.

1997 greatest hits albums
Paul Kelly (Australian musician) albums
Compilation albums by Australian artists
Mushroom Records compilation albums